The Mini Mustang was a scale replica of the P-51 Mustang. It featured aluminium construction and manual retractable landing gear.

Operational history
After the crash of the first prototype, two new aircraft were built of a new design.

Variants
The L1 Mustang was the original prototype. The original crashed in 1966.
The L2 Mustang featured longer canopy, balanced elevators, reshaped engine cowling and air-scoop, and a four-blade propeller replacing the two-blade ones.

Specifications Mini Mustang

See also

References

Homebuilt aircraft
1960s United States sport aircraft
Single-engined tractor aircraft
Low-wing aircraft
Aircraft manufactured in the United States
North American P-51 Mustang replicas
Aircraft first flown in 1962